The Pleasant Ridge Church in Phillipsburg, Kansas, known also as Sod Church is a church which was built in 1898. It was added to the National Register of Historic Places in 2005.

It is a  building, built in a national folk architectural style.  It replaced a sod church across the road.

Regular church services ended in 1969.  In 1989 the property was sold to the Pleasant Ridge Historical Society, Inc.

References

External links

Historical Information

Churches in Kansas
Churches on the National Register of Historic Places in Kansas
Churches completed in 1898
Buildings and structures in Phillips County, Kansas
1898 establishments in Kansas
National Register of Historic Places in Phillips County, Kansas